Givi Georgiyevich Nodia (2 January 1948 – 7 April 2005) was a Soviet Georgian association football player.

Honours
 Soviet Top League bronze: 1967, 1969, 1971, 1972.
 Soviet Top League top scorer: 1970.
 Grigory Fedotov Club member.
 UEFA Euro 1972 runner-up.

International career
Nodia made his debut for USSR on 29 November 1967 in a friendly against the Netherlands. He was selected for the UEFA Euro 1968 squad, but did not play in any games at the tournament. He played at the 1970 FIFA World Cup, making history as the first player in World Cup history to receive a yellow card. He also played at UEFA Euro 1972, where USSR were the runners-up.

References

External links
 RussiaTeam biography 

1948 births
2005 deaths
People from Kutaisi
Sportspeople from Kutaisi
Soviet footballers
Soviet football managers
Footballers from Georgia (country)
Football managers from Georgia (country)
Expatriate football managers from Georgia (country)
1970 FIFA World Cup players
UEFA Euro 1968 players
UEFA Euro 1972 players
Soviet Union international footballers
FC Lokomotiv Moscow players
FC Torpedo Kutaisi players
FC Dinamo Tbilisi players
Soviet Top League players
FC Dinamo Tbilisi managers
FC Torpedo Kutaisi managers
FC Lokomotivi Tbilisi managers
FC Lokomotiv Saint Petersburg managers
FC Metalurgi Rustavi managers
Association football forwards